Birgitte Vind (born 13 August 1965 in Vejle) is a Danish politician, who is a member of the Folketing for the Social Democrats political party. She was elected into parliament at the 2019 Danish general election.

Political career
From 2010 to 2019 Vind was a member of Vejle Municipality's municipal council. She was elected into parliament at the 2019 election where she received 7,012 votes.

References

External links 
 Biography on the website of the Danish Parliament (Folketinget)

1965 births
Living people
People from Vejle Municipality
Social Democrats (Denmark) politicians
21st-century Danish women politicians
Danish municipal councillors
Women members of the Folketing
Members of the Folketing 2019–2022
Members of the Folketing 2022–2026